Los Monchis is a television show from the Mexican TV network Telehit hosted by Lalo and Beto.

References
 Los Monchis official website

Mexican music television series